Club Polideportivo Sanvicenteño is a Spanish football team based in San Vicente de Alcántara in the autonomous community of Extremadura. Founded in 2001, it plays in Primera Regional de Extremadura .

History
Founded in 1957 as C.D. Sanvicenteño, it was renamed Sanvicenteño F.C. in 1967.

In 2001 it was reestablished as C.P. Sanvicenteño and started in Primera Regional de Extremadura (Level 6).

C.D. Sanvicenteño - (1957–1967)
Sanvicenteño F.C. - (1967–2001)
C.P. Sanvicenteño - (2001–)

Season to season
{|
|valign="top" width=49%|

|valign="top" width=50%|

19 seasons in Tercera División

External links
Official website 
Futbolme.com profile 

Football clubs in Extremadura
Association football clubs established in 2001
Divisiones Regionales de Fútbol clubs
2001 establishments in Spain